Sandra or SANDRA may refer to:

People
 Sandra (given name)
 Sandra (singer) (born 1962), German pop singer
 Margaretha Sandra (1629–1674), Dutch soldier
 Sandra (orangutan), who won the legal right to be defined as a "non-human person"

Places
 Șandra, a commune in Timiș County, Romania
 Şandra, a village in Beltiug Commune, Satu Mare County, Romania
 Sandra, Estonia, a village
 1760 Sandra, an asteroid

Other uses
 "Sandra" (song), a 1975 song by Barry Manilow 
 "Sandra", song by Idle Eyes, 1986
 Sandra (1924 film), a lost drama film 
 Sandra (1965 film), an Italian film
 SANDRA (research project), part of the European Union's Framework Programmes for Research and Technological Development
 Tropical Storm Sandra, several tropical cyclones
 Sandra (podcast), a scripted fiction podcast starring Kristen Wiig and Alia Shawkat

See also
 Sandro (disambiguation)
 Sandara Park, a South Korean personality, actress, singer and model who rose to fame both in South Korea and in the Philippines